Rech (current Russian: Речь, originally: Рѣчь) was a Russian daily newspaper and the central organ of the Constitutional Democratic Party.

History 
Rech was published in St. Petersburg from February 1906 to October 1917. Julian Buck, an engineer and philanthropist, was the first editor. The newspaper was based in his house on Kirochnaya street, № 24, in apartment № 21. Its editorial office and printing house were located at Zhukovsky street, № 21. It was a radical paper. Politically it supported approachment with Britain and France (e.g. welcomed the Anglo-Russian Convention). It was closed down by the Bolsheviks after the October Revolution 1917.

References

External links
"Rech" digital archives in "Newspapers on the web and beyond", the digital resource of the National Library of Russia

1906 establishments in the Russian Empire
1917 disestablishments in Russia
Newspapers established in 1906
Publications disestablished in 1917
Defunct newspapers published in Russia
Russian-language newspapers
Mass media in Saint Petersburg
Constitutional Democratic Party